General transcription factor IIE subunit 1 (GTF2E1), also known as transcription initiation factor IIE subunit alpha (TFIIE-alpha), is a protein that in humans is encoded by the GTF2E1 gene.

See also 
 Transcription factor II E

References

Further reading 

 
 
 
 
 
 
 
 
 
 
 
 
 
 
 
 
 
 
 

Transcription factors